The Shaffer's Bridge is a historic covered bridge in Conemaugh Township, Somerset County, Pennsylvania.  It was built in 1877, and is a  Burr truss bridge, with a shingle covered gable roof. The bridge crosses Ben's Creek.  It is one of 10 covered bridges in Somerset County.

It was added to the National Register of Historic Places in 1980.

References

Covered bridges in Somerset County, Pennsylvania
Covered bridges on the National Register of Historic Places in Pennsylvania
Bridges completed in 1877
Bridges in Somerset County, Pennsylvania
National Register of Historic Places in Somerset County, Pennsylvania
Road bridges on the National Register of Historic Places in Pennsylvania
Wooden bridges in Pennsylvania
Burr Truss bridges in the United States
1877 establishments in Pennsylvania